Miffy the Movie (originally released under the title Nijntje de film in the Netherlands) is a 2013 Dutch stop motion animated family film, based on the Miffy character created by Dick Bruna. Produced by KRO and A. Film A/S, the movie debuted on 30 January 2013 in the Netherlands.

The series is animated in the style of Miffy and Friends, the first television adaptation of Miffy.

Synopsis 
The titular rabbit, Miffy, goes on a treasure hunt at a zoo. Along with her friends Snuffy the dog, Melanie the rabbit and Grunty the pig, she is able to complete the quest through problem-solving.

Cast

Release 
The film was first announced on 18 May 2010, with an expected release date of November 2011. Production was delayed for unknown reasons, and the first trailer for Miffy the Movie was released in 2012. The film was first screened in the Netherlands, its country of origin, and was distributed by Warner Bros. Pictures. On 22 March 2013, the film was released in Japan. In Canada, Miffy the Movie premiered as part of the 2013 Toronto International Film Festival. The movie saw its Australian release on 11 May 2013; for this country, Miffy the Movie was distributed by Transmission Films.

The film was released in several additional countries in 2015, to celebrate the sixtieth anniversary of the "Miffy" character. The movie was released in Poland on 1 June 2015 and in the United Kingdom on 21 June 2015.

A Dutch-language DVD was released on 26 June 2013 in the Netherlands. A German disc was released on 9 March 2014 and a Region 1 DVD featuring an English audio track was released on 2 December 2014 in North America, despite the film not getting a theatrical release in Germany and the United States.

Accolades

References

External links 
 

2013 films
Animated films based on children's books
Animated films based on animated series
Animated films about rabbits and hares
Dutch animated films
Dutch children's films
Dutch comedy films
2010s Dutch-language films
Films based on Dutch novels
2010s stop-motion animated films
2010s children's animated films